Roșiori is a commune located in Brăila County, Muntenia, Romania. It is composed of four villages: Colțea, Florica, Pribeagu and Roșiori.

References

Communes in Brăila County
Localities in Muntenia